Serhiy Mykolayovych Boyko (born 30 June 1977) is a Ukrainian international referee and a former player.

Boiko became a FIFA referee in 2011. He has refereed at 2014 FIFA World Cup qualifiers, beginning with the match between Sweden and Kazakhstan.

References

External links
 Profile at allplayers.in.ua
 

1977 births
Living people
Ukrainian footballers
Ukrainian football referees
People from Bilhorod-Dnistrovskyi
Association football goalkeepers
FC Tyras-2500 Bilhorod-Dnistrovskyi players
FC Portovyk Illichivsk players
Ukrainian Second League players
Sportspeople from Odesa Oblast